Viktor Petakov (born 27 January 1989) is a Bulgarian footballer, who plays for Austrian club ATSV Bamminger (Sattledt) in Landesliga West. He primarily plays as left/right winger, but he can play as striker too.

External links

Official website

1989 births
Living people
Bulgarian footballers
Association football midfielders
First Professional Football League (Bulgaria) players
PFC Lokomotiv Mezdra players
OFC Sliven 2000 players
PFC Pirin Blagoevgrad players
FC Pomorie players